Steady Company is a 1932 pre-Code American action film directed by Edward Ludwig, written by Edward Ludwig and Earle Snell, and starring Norman Foster, June Clyde, ZaSu Pitts, Henry Armetta, J. Farrell MacDonald and Maurice Black. It was released on March 14, 1932, by Universal Pictures.

Cast 
Norman Foster as Jim
June Clyde as Peggy
ZaSu Pitts as Dot
Henry Armetta as Tony Capri
J. Farrell MacDonald as Hogan
Maurice Black as Blix
Morgan Wallace as Tuxedo Carter
Jack Perry as Pico Vacci
Morrie Cohan as Curly Blake
Willard Robertson as Pop Henley

References

External links 
 

1932 films
1930s English-language films
American action films
1930s action films
Universal Pictures films
Films directed by Edward Ludwig
American black-and-white films
1930s American films